Control Me is the third album from punk rock band The Forgotten. It is their first release under BYO Records. It was released in September 2002 on black vinyl and CD. It contains one of the band's most popular songs "Retrofitted".

Track listing

Personnel
Gordy Carbone – Lead vocals 
Craig Fairbaugh – Guitar, Vocals
Johnny (Bleachedjeans) Gregurich – Bass guitar, Vocals 
Dave Kashka – Drums

Production
Steve Kravak and The Forgotten – Producer
Steve Kravak – Engineer

References

2002 albums
The Forgotten (band) albums
BYO Records albums